The peach-throated monitor (Varanus jobiensis), also known commonly as the Sepik monitor, is a species of monitor lizard in the family Varanidae. The species is native to New Guinea.

Taxonomy
Varanus jobiensis belongs to the subgenus Euprepiosaurus, which includes species such as the blue-tailed monitor and mangrove monitor, both of which it is sympatric with in much of its range.

It is likely that this species is actually a species complex of multiple different species that have been diverging since the Pliocene, and diverged from the V. indicus species complex 4.7 million years ago.

Distribution
Varanus jobiensis is endemic to New Guinea and surrounding islands such as Biak, Salawati, Yapen, Normanby, and Waigeo.

Description
The colour of the throat is white-yellow to red, to which one of its common names refers.

Diet
Varanus jobiensis primarily eats insects, and sometimes frogs, but may also take freshwater fish and small mammals.

As food
Varanus jobiensis is hunted for human consumption in New Guinea.

Reproduction
Varanus jobiensis is oviparous.

Etymology
The specific name, jobiensis, which is Latin, means "from Jobi". Jobi is the island also known as Yapen, which is the type locality of this species.

The junior synonym, Varanus karlschmidti, was named in honor of American herpetologist Karl Patterson Schmidt.

References

Further reading
Ahl E (1932). "Eine neue Eidechse und zwei neue Frösche von der Insel Jobi ". Mitteilungen aus dem Zoologischen Museum in Berlin 17: 892–899. (Varanus indicus jobiensis, new subspecies, p. 892). (in German).
Mertens R (1951). "A New Lizard of the Genus Varanus from New Guinea". Fieldiana Zoology 31 (43): 467–471. (Varanus karlschmidti, new species).
Ziegler T, Schmitz A, Koch A, Böhme W (2007). "A review of the subgenus Euprepiosauras of Varanus (Squamata: Varanidae): morphological and molecular phylogeny, distribution and zoogeography, with an identification key for members of the V. indicus and V. prasinus species groups". Zootaxa 1472: 1-28.

External links
Photo at Varanus.net
Care of Varanus jobiensis at Repticzone.com

Varanus
Monitor lizards of New Guinea
Endemic fauna of New Guinea
Reptiles of Western New Guinea
Reptiles of Papua New Guinea
Reptiles described in 1932
Taxa named by Ernst Ahl